The women's 400 metres hurdles at the 2002 European Athletics Championships were held at the Olympic Stadium on August 7–8.

Medalists

Results

Heats
Qualification: First 2 of each heat (Q) and the next 2 fastest qualified for the final.

Final

External links

400
400 metres hurdles at the European Athletics Championships
2002 in women's athletics